Eric J. Rignot is a chancellor professor of Earth system science at the University of California, Irvine, and senior research scientist for the Radar Science and Engineering Section at NASA's Jet Propulsion Laboratory.

Education 
In 1985, Rignot studied an engineering degree at the École Centrale des Arts et Manufactures, Paris, France, where he took classes in physics, chemistry, math, and economics. After a year, he took Master of Science in Astronomy at the University of Paris VI Pierre et Marie Curie, Paris, France. In 1987 and 1988 he took Master of Science in Electrical Engineering and Master of Science in Aerospace Engineering, consecutively, in the University of Southern California. It is also in the University of Southern California where he pursued Doctor of Philosophy in Electrical Engineering in 1991.

Work
He is a principal investigator on several NASA-funded projects to study the mass balance of the Greenland ice sheets and Antarctic ice sheets by using radar interferometry and other methods; the interactions of ice shelves with the ocean; and the dynamic retreat of Patagonian glaciers. In particular, Rignot's primary research interests are glaciology, climate change, radar remote sensing, ice sheet numerical modeling, interferometric synthetic-aperture radar, radio echo sounding, and ice-ocean interactions. His research group focuses on understanding the interactions of ice and climate, ice sheet mass balance, ice-ocean interactions in Greenland and Antarctica, and current/future contributions of ice sheets to sea level change.

In 2007 he contributed to the IPCC Fourth Assessment Report WGI (Working Group I) which was awarded the Nobel Peace Prize along with VP Al Gore.

Awards
Rignot received several awards and honors.
Fellow of American Association for the Advancement of Science (2019)
Member of National Academy of Sciences, USA (2018) 
Louis Agassiz Medal of the European Geosciences Union (2017) 
Fellow of American Geophysical Union (2013)
NASA Outstanding Leadership Medal (2012)
NASA Group Achievement Award, IceBridge Mission (2011)
NASA Group Achievement Award, Ice Sheet System Model (2011)
National Science Foundation's Antarctic Service Medal (2009) 
NASA Group Achievement Award, Warm Ice Sounding Explorer Team (2009)
Bowie Lecture, American Geophysical Union (2008)
NASA Exceptional Scientific Achievement Medal (2007)
NASA JPL Edward Stone Award for Outstanding Research Publication (2004)
NASA JPL Level A Award for Technical Achievement (2004)
NASA Exceptional Scientific Achievement Medal (2003)
Nomination of ”Rignot Glacier, Antarctica” by U. S. Board Geogr. Names (2003)
NASA JPL Edward Stone Award for Outstanding Research Publication (2002)
NASA JPL Lew Allen Award for Excellence (1998) 
Prize Paper Award IEEE Geos. Rem. Sens. Soc. (1994)

Publications
An overview of Rignot's research publications can be obtained via his Google Scholar profile.

Based on study findings, he noted that the observed speed at which glaciers in Greenland are melting is considerably faster than he had anticipated. In 2014 Rignot was the lead author on a widely publicized study which based on grounding line retreat, found that the melting of glaciers in the Amundsen Sea appears to be unstoppable. Rignot said that these glaciers have "passed the point of no return."

See also
Operation IceBridge
Sea level rise
Thwaites Glacier
Pine Island Glacier
Marie Byrd Land

References

External links
Preview of HBO Vice: Our Rising Oceans with Eric Rignot (2015)
AGU 2015: Eric Rignot - Ice Sheet Systems and Sea Level Change (Sea level rise)
NASA Operation IceBridge
NASA Oceans Melting Greenland (OMG) - NASA

Living people
American earth scientists
University of California, Irvine faculty
NASA people
University of Southern California alumni
Jet Propulsion Laboratory faculty
American Antarctic scientists
Marie Byrd Land explorers and scientists
Members of the United States National Academy of Sciences
Fellows of the American Association for the Advancement of Science
Fellows of the American Geophysical Union
1961 births